Kandahar International Cricket Stadium is a cricket stadium in Kandahar, Afghanistan. It is currently under construction.

The stadium is built on 44 acres of land in the heart of Aino Meyna, a new suburb of Kandahar. The land was donated by Mahmood Karzai to the Afghanistan Cricket Board in 2012.

In August 2014, the Government of India approved the grant of $1 million for the construction of the stadium under the Small Development Project Scheme. Construction of the stadium was delayed for two years but has resumed in early 2016, and is expected to be completed before the summer of 2017. As of October 17, 2016, about 70% of the construction work has been completed.

It is expected that once the stadium opens, cricket will become more popular in southern Afghanistan. The Kandahar International Cricket Stadium will be one of the leading cricket stadiums in Afghanistan after Ghazi Amanullah International Cricket Stadium in the Ghazi Amanullah Town of Jalalabad, and Alokozay Kabul International Cricket Ground in Kabul.

It is hoped that the stadium will be able to attract international teams to play Afghanistan who became full members of the ICC in 2017.

References

External links
 cricinfo

Cricket grounds in Afghanistan
Buildings and structures in Kandahar